"One Hundred Things You Should Have Done in Bed" was the second single released by Scottish-Northern Irish indie rock band Snow Patrol.  It was released on 11 May 1998 under the Jeepster record label, and was later used as part of their debut album Songs for Polarbears.

It peaked in the United Kingdom at number 157, becoming the first single by the band to chart.

Track listing
7" Vinyl
A: "One Hundred Things You Should Have Done in Bed" - 2:11
B: "My Last Girlfriend" - 2:59

Maxi CD
"One Hundred Things You Should Have Done in Bed" - 2:11
"My Last Girlfriend" - 2:59
"T.M.T" - 2:51
"I Could Stay Away Forever" - 4:30
"One Hundred Things You Should Have Done in Bed" (Video)

The video for "One Hundred Things You Should Have Done in Bed" was uncredited. It was not mentioned in the artwork.

Charts

References

External links
Official music video

1998 singles
Snow Patrol songs
Songs written by Gary Lightbody
1998 songs
Songs written by Mark McClelland
Jeepster Records singles